Ghukas Poghosyan (born 6 February 1994) is an Armenian footballer.

Career

Club
On 31 May 2016, Poghosyan signed a  two-year contract with FC Shirak. In 2017 he was transferred to FC Banants.

On 17 February 2021, Poghosyan signed for Lori.

International
Poghosyan has played in one match for the Armenian senior team, coming on as a substitute in Armenia's 0–2 loss to Serbia on 28 February 2012.

References

External links
 
 
 

1994 births
Living people
Armenian footballers
Association football midfielders
Armenia international footballers
Armenia under-21 international footballers
Armenia youth international footballers
Armenian expatriate footballers
Expatriate footballers in Belarus
Armenian Premier League players
FC Shirak players
FC Pyunik players
FC Urartu players
FC Gorodeya players
FC Alashkert players
FC Van players
FC Lori players
Sevan FC players